Tungevaag & Raaban was a dance music producer duo consisting of the Norwegian Martin Tungevaag from Stadlandet in Norway, and the Swedish Robbin Söderlund (better known by his artistic name Raaban) from Borås in Sweden. Sharing a common interest for the EDM genre, they have both collaborated and separately produced music within the genre for many years. On December 9, 2019, the duo announced on Instagram that "creatively we will pursue different goals and paths".

Discography

Singles

Notes

Remixes

Awards and nominations

References

External links 
 

Norwegian DJs
Swedish DJs
Norwegian record producers
Swedish record producers
Musicians from Ålesund
People from Borås
Electronic dance music DJs